Sandra Weeser (born 8 September 1969) is a German politician of the Free Democratic Party (FDP) who has been serving as a member of the Bundestag from the state of Rhineland-Palatinate since 2017.

Early life 
Born in Siegen, North Rhine-Westphalia, Weeser obtained a degree in business administration in a dual education. She managed a car dealership from 2004 and worked for a major American corporation from 2011 to 2016. She was then Vice President of the Structural and Approval Directorate North in Koblenz.

Political career 
Weeser became a member of the Bundestag in the 2017 German federal election. She is a member of the Committee on Economic Affairs and Energy.

In addition to her committee assignments, Weeser has been a member of the German delegation to the Franco-German Parliamentary Assembly since 2019.

In the negotiations to form a so-called traffic light coalition of the Social Democratic Party (SPD), the Green Party and the FDP following the 2021 federal elections, Weeser was part of her party's delegation in the working group on climate change and energy policy, co-chaired by Matthias Miersch, Oliver Krischer and Lukas Köhler.

References

External links 

  
 Bundestag biography
 

 

 

1969 births
Living people
Members of the Bundestag for Rhineland-Palatinate
Female members of the Bundestag
21st-century German women politicians
Members of the Bundestag 2017–2021
Members of the Bundestag 2021–2025
Members of the Bundestag for the Free Democratic Party (Germany)
People from Siegen